Gordon White may refer to:

 Gordon White (cricketer) (1882–1918), South African cricketer
 Gordon White, Baron White of Hull (1923–1995), British businessman
 Gordon White (basketball), American college basketball coach